"The Armoury" Army Museum in Trondheim (Norwegian: Rustkammeret i Trondheim) is a military museum in the Archbishop's Palace (Erkebispegården) in Trondheim, Norway. Today it is a Norwegian army museum as well as a resistance museum, emphasizing the military history of Trøndelag.

The museum has weapons, uniforms and other artifacts on display, starting with the Viking Age, going through the Middle Ages and the Norwegian union with Denmark (1380–1814) and later with Sweden (1814–1905), up to the German occupation of Norway during World War II (1940–1945).

References

External links 

Military and war museums in Norway
World War II museums in Norway
Museums in Trondheim
Norwegian resistance movement
Museums established in 1826
1826 establishments in Norway